Chlorotrifluorosilane is an inorganic gaseous compound with formula SiClF3 composed of silicon, fluorine and chlorine. It is a silane that substitutes hydrogen with fluorine and chlorine atoms.

Production
By heating a mixture of anhydrous aluminium chloride and sodium hexafluorosilicate to between 190 and 250 °C a mixture of gases containing chlorotrifluorosilane is given off.  These are condensed at -196 °C degrees and fractionally distilled at temperatures up to -78 °C.

SiClF3 can be made by reacting silicon tetrachloride and silicon tetrafluoride gases at 600 °C, producing a mixture of fluorochlorosilanes including about one quarter SiClF3.

SiClF3 can be made by reacting silicon tetrachloride with antimony trifluoride. An antimony pentachloride catalyst assists.  The products are distilled to separate it out from tetrafluorosilane and dichlorodifluorosilane.

At high temperatures above 500 °C silicon tetrafluoride can react with phosphorus trichloride to yield some SiClF3.  This is unusual because SiF4 is very stable.

Silicon tetrachloride can react with trifluoro(trichloromethyl)silane to yield SiClF3 and CCl3SiCl3.

2-Chloroethyltrifluorosilane or 1,2-dichloroethyltrifluorosilane can be disassociated by an infrared laser to yield SiClF3 and C2H4 (ethylene) or vinyl chloride.  By tuning the laser to a vibration frequency of a particular isotope of silicon, different isotopomers can be selectively broken up in order to have a product that only concentrates one isotope of silicon. So silicon-30 can be increased to 80% by using the 934.5 cm−1 line in a CO2 laser.

The first published preparation of SiClF3 by Schumb and Gamble was by exploding hexafluorodisilane in chlorine: Si2F6 + Cl2 → 2SiClF3. Other products of this explosion may include amorphous silicon, SiCl2F2 and SiF4.

Chlorine reacts with silicon tetrafluoride in the presence of aluminium chips at 500-600 °C to make mostly silicon tetra chloride and some SiClF3.

Mercuric chloride when heated with SiF3Co(CO)4 breaks the bond to form a 90% yield of SiClF3.

The combination of SiF4 and chlorodimethylphosphine yields some SiClF3.

Trifluorosilane SiHF3 reacts with gaseous chlorine to yield SiClF3 and HCl.

Properties

Molecular size and angles
Bond length for Si–Cl is 1.996 Å and for Si–F is 1.558 Å. The bond angle ∠FSiCl = 110.2° and ∠FSiF = 108.7°. The bond length between silicon and chlorine is unusually short, indicating a 31% double bond.  This can be explained by the more ionic fluoride bonds withdrawing some charge allowing a partial positive charge on the chlorine.

The molecular dipole moment is 0.636 Debye.

Bulk properties
Between 129.18 and 308.83 K the vapour pressure in mm Hg at temperature T in K is given by log10 P = 102.6712 -2541.6/T -43.347 log10 T + 0.071921T -0.000045231 T2.

The heat of formation of chlorotrifluorosilane is -315.0 kcal/mol at 298K.

Reactions
Chlorotrifluorosilane is hydrolysed by water to produce silica.

Chlorotrifluorosilane reacts with trimethylstannane ((CH3)3SnH) at room temperature to make trifluorosilane in about 60 hours.

Use
Proposed uses include a dielectric gas with a high breakdown voltage, and low global warming potential, a precursor for making fluorinated silica soot, and a vapour deposition gas.

Related substances
Chlorotrifluorosilane can form an addition compound with pyridine with formula SiClF3.2py (py=pyridine) An addition compound with trimethylamine exists. This addition compound is made by mixing trimethylamine vapour with Chlorotrifluorosilane and condensing out a solid at -78 °C.  If this was allowed to soak in trimethylamine liquid for over eight hours, a diamine complex formed (2Me3N·SiClF3). At 0° the disassociation pressure of the monoamine complex was 23 mm Hg.

SiClF3− is a trigonal bipyramidal shape with a Cl and F atom on the axis. It is formed when gamma rays hit the neutral molecule.

Chlorotetrafluorosilicate (IV) (SiClF4−) can form a stable a pale yellow crystalline compound tetraethylammonium chlorotetrafluorosilicate.

References

Extra reading

Chlorosilanes
Fluorides
Inorganic silicon compounds
Gases
Nonmetal halides